Götzis is a town in the western Austrian state of Vorarlberg. The Alpine Rhine valley municipality belongs to the district of Feldkirch.

Population

Events
The town is well known for its annual hypo-combined events meeting, the so-called Hypo-Meeting, where some of the world's leading decathletes and heptathletes gather in the Mösle stadium. Past winners at Götzis include former decathlon world record holder, Olympic and world champion Roman Šebrle (who achieved the record at the 2001 Götzis meeting), world champion Bryan Clay and Olympic champion Carolina Klüft.

Notable people
Hotelier Johannes Baur was born in Götzis in 1795.
The singer Elfi Graf (born 1952) lives in Götzis.
 Jürgen Loacker (born 1974), bobsledder.

References

External links
Town of Götzis

Cities and towns in Feldkirch District
Bregenz Forest Mountains